The Clones and Cavan Extension Railway was an extension of the Ulster Railway from Clones in County Monaghan to Cavan opened in 1862.  The station in Cavan was opened firstly by the Midland Great Western Railway with trains to Dublin Broadstone. However the Ulster Railway also sought to connect Cavan with Belfast Great Victoria Street.

References

Closed railways in Ireland
1862 establishments in Ireland
Railway companies established in 1862